The 2023 Pune Challenger was a professional tennis tournament played on hard courts. It was the seventh edition of the tournament which was part of the 2023 ATP Challenger Tour. It took place in Pune, India from 27 February to 6 March 2023.

Singles main-draw entrants

Seeds

 1 Rankings are as of 20 February 2023.

Other entrants
The following players received wildcards into the singles main draw:
  Arjun Kadhe
  Sumit Nagal
  Mukund Sasikumar

The following player received entry into the singles main draw using a protected ranking:
  Marc Polmans

The following players received entry into the singles main draw as alternates:
  Prajnesh Gunneswaran
  Hiroki Moriya

The following players received entry from the qualifying draw:
  Chung Yun-seong
  Benjamin Lock
  Nikola Milojević
  Makoto Ochi
  Dominik Palán
  Akira Santillan

The following player received entry as a lucky loser:
  Jay Clarke

Champions

Singles

  Max Purcell def.  Luca Nardi 6–2, 6–3.

Doubles

  Anirudh Chandrasekar /  Vijay Sundar Prashanth def.  Toshihide Matsui /  Kaito Uesugi 6–1, 4–6, [10–3].

References

2023 ATP Challenger Tour
2023
February 2023 sports events in India
March 2023 sports events in India
2023 in Indian sport